Queen's Cup is a former annual football competition in Thailand (1970-2010).

Queen's Cup may also refer to:

 Cartier Queen's Cup, an annual polo tournament in England
 Queen's Cup (golf), an annual golf tournament in Thailand
 Queen's Cup (ice hockey), an annual ice hockey championship in Canada
 Queen's Cup (horse race), an Australian horse race held in rotation in different states; called King's Cup from 1927 to 1951
  SAJC Queen's Cup, name used in South Australia
 Queen's cup, a common name for a flowering plant native to western North America

See also
 Elizabeth Stakes (disambiguation), for some races referred to informally as the Queen's Cup
 Queen of Cups, tarot card
 The Queens (golf), a women's professional team golf tournament held in Japan